The Orr-Lewis Baronetcy, of Whitewebbs Park in the parish of Enfield in the County of Middlesex, was a title in the Baronetage of the United Kingdom. It was created on 12 February 1920 for the Canadian businessman Frederick Orr-Lewis. The title became extinct on the death of his only son Duncan, the second Baronet, in 1980.

Frederick Orr-Lewis owned the  estate of Whitewebbs Park in Enfield. In 1931, his son Duncan sold the estate to the County Council, which constructed a public golf course on the property. The Estate House, which dates to 1791, is now a public restaurant and two estate lodges remain.

Orr-Lewis baronets, of Whitewebbs Park (1920)
Sir Frederick Orr Orr-Lewis, 1st Baronet (1866–1921)
Sir (John) Duncan Orr-Lewis, 2nd Baronet (1898–1980)

References
Kidd, Charles, Williamson, David (editors). Debrett's Peerage and Baronetage (1990 edition). New York: St Martin's Press, 1990, 

Notes

External links
Whitewebbs Park

Extinct baronetcies in the Baronetage of the United Kingdom